PNE Agrodome  is a sports arena located in Vancouver, British Columbia. It was built in 1963 and holds 5,000 people or 3,260 when configured to use the hockey or lacrosse surface.

It annually hosted the provincial high school boys' 'AAA' basketball championships until 2010. The tournament moved to the Langley Events Centre in 2011.

It was used as a professional wrestling venue by NWA All-Star Wrestling for bigger events in the 1960s and 1970s, and more recently by WWE for smaller events.

It served as the home field for the Vancouver Whitecaps for the 1981–82 NASL indoor soccer season, when the Pacific Coliseum became unavailable.

It was host to the Vancouver Voodoo roller hockey franchise from 1993 to 1994.

It was home to the Vancouver Burrards Western Lacrosse Association team from 1990 through 1993. The team moved to the North Surrey Recreation Centre for the 1994 season.

The venue played the role of the Soviet arena in the climactic fight between Rocky Balboa and Ivan Drago in the movie Rocky IV. It also portrayed Olympic Center in Lake Placid, New York for the film Miracle.  It has also appeared in films such as Slap Shot 2 and Deadpool and in episodes of MacGyver, Booker, and Highlander. It was also disguised as a roller rink for the opening scene in Diary of a Wimpy Kid: Rodrick Rules, due to the lack of a roller rink in Greater Vancouver. Most recently it served as an ice arena for The Mighty Ducks: Game Changers, a reboot of the 1990's The Mighty Ducks movie franchise, as the fictional Minnesota Igloo.

The Arena hosted concerts by some of the world's biggest rock acts on their early tours. Some of these acts include The Rolling Stones (1965), Bob Dylan (1966), The Who (1967), Led Zeppelin (twice in 1969), Vanilla Fudge (1969), The Mothers of Invention (1969), Ike & Tina Turner (1970), Pink Floyd (1970),  Deep Purple (1972) and Wishbone Ash (1975).

References

External links
 The PNE's Agrodome information

 

Indoor ice hockey venues in British Columbia
Music venues in Vancouver
North American Soccer League (1968–1984) indoor venues
Boxing venues in Canada
Hastings Park
Vancouver VooDoo